Joseph Chusak Sirisut (born February 24, 1956) is a Thai Roman Catholic prelate currently serving as the bishop of the Diocese of Nakhon Ratchasima in northeastern Thailand.

Life
Born at Bang Nok Kwaek, the center of the Diocese of Ratchaburi, he studied at the Sampran Major Seminary to become a priest. He received a B.A. in scholastic administration at the Sukhothai Thammathirat Open University and a Masters in Theology in the United States. He was ordained as priest on May 11, 1984.

After ordination he was first headmaster of the Daruna school, in 1986 became administrator and director of the Ratchaburi Institute. 1987 he was assigned to the Kanchanaburi parish and later to Ratchaburi parish. 1995 he became assistant priest at St. Girolamo in Samut Songkram, 1997 diocesan bursar and chancellor. From 2000-2004 he was a Licentiate in Theology at St. Tomaso in Manila. Returning to Thailand, he was professor at the Sampran major seminary and director of the Centre for Cultural and Religious Research at Sam Phran.

On November 30, 2006, he was appointed as the bishop of Nakhon Ratchasima, and ordained on February 10, 2007, by his predecessor Joachim Phayao Manisap. Co-Consecrators were the Apostolic nuncio in Thailand, Archbishop Salvatore Pennacchio, and George Yod Phimphisan, Bishop of Udon Thani.

Coat of arms
The bishopric coat of arms is subdivided into four fields. The star in the upper right quarter symbolizes mother Mary. To the upper left is the holy bible and a housel below. The pigeon in the lower right holds an olive branch in her beak, the common peace symbol. In the lower left is a Fleur-de-lis, which is the symbol of Saint Joseph, the patron saint of the bishop. His motto written below the shield is "Ad Gloriam Dei" (to the glory of God, 1 Corinthians 10:31).

References

External links

Catholic Hierarchy
Fides Service on his appointment as bishop
Curriculum vitae at diocese website (Thai)

21st-century Roman Catholic bishops in Thailand

1956 births
Living people